Golfer may refer to:

 A person who plays golf
 Professional golfer

See also
 Lists of golfers